Judaism, the second-largest religion practiced in New York, with over 2.2 million followers in New York State; and with approximately 1.6 million adherents in New York City as of 2022, represents the largest Jewish community of any city in the world, greater than the combined totals of Tel Aviv and Jerusalem. Nearly half of the city's Jews live in Brooklyn. The ethno-religious population makes up 18.4% of the city and its religious demographic makes up 8%. The first recorded Jewish settler was Jacob Barsimson, who arrived in August 1654 on a passport from the Dutch West India Company. Following the assassination of Alexander II of Russia, for which many blamed "the Jews", the 36 years beginning in 1881 experienced the largest wave of Jewish immigration to the United States. In 2012, the largest Jewish denominations were Orthodox, Haredi, and Conservative Judaism. Reform Jewish communities are prevalent through the area. Congregation Emanu-El of New York in Manhattan is the largest Reform synagogue in the world.

Jews have settled in New York State since the 17th century. In August 1654, the first known Jewish settler, Jacob Barsimson, came to New Amsterdam. The Dutch colonial port city was the seat of the government for the New Netherland territory and became New York City in 1664. The first significant group of Jewish settlers came in September 1654 as refugees from Recife, Brazil to New Amsterdam. Portugal had just conquered Brazil from the Dutch Republic, and the Spanish and Portuguese Jews there promptly fled to New Amsterdam, the precursor to present-day New York City. A group of 23 Jewish immigrants in New Amsterdam was greeted by director general Peter Stuyvesant who was at first unwilling to accept them.

The Jewish population in New York City went from about 80,000 in 1880 to 1.6 million in 1920. By 1910, more than 1 million Jews made up 25 percent of New York's population and made it the world's largest Jewish city. As of 2022, about 1.6 million residents of New York City, or about 18 percent of its residents, were Jewish. New York State is home to more than 2.2 million Jews, constituting approximately 11 percent of the state's total population. Due in large part to the rise in the Hasidic Jewish population, New York City's Jewish population is once again increasing rapidly. Long Island and the Hudson Valley represent the two largest suburban concentrations of Jews in New York.

Early Jewish immigration

Jacob Barsimson 
Jacob Barsimson was the first Jewish immigrant to arrive in  New Amsterdam on August 22, 1654 on the Dutch West India Company ship, the Peartree (de Pereboom). He received the appropriate permissions and met no opposition by then Governor Peter Stuyvesant or his council upon arrival. He along with Asser Levy fought to allow the first wave of 23 Jewish immigrants to stay in New Amsterdam.

First wave 
The first significant group of Jews to arrive in New York after Jacob Barsimson was a group of 23 Jewish immigrants in September 1654 fleeing from the Spanish and Portuguese Inquisitions. Following the mass expulsion of Jews from Spain in 1492 and the forced conversions of some 100,000 Jews in Portugal, many had fled to different regions of Europe and the New World. Dutch Brazil proved to be a haven for many, and a colony in Recife became a prosperous Jewish Community.

In the 1650s, Portugal retook control of Dutch Brazil, and the Inquisition soon followed. After the Portuguese occupation of Pernambuco many of the Jewish residents of Recife fled in an attempt to return to New Amsterdam. One ship, the St. Charles, was forced to divert its course after encountering Pirates on their course to Holland. After attempting to land in multiple Spanish ports, they eventually arrived at New Amsterdam without passports.

These immigrants were forced to sign a contract with the Captain of the St. Charles to bring them to New Amsterdam. Upon arrival they did not have sufficient funds to pay for their transit. Their remaining possessions were auctioned by Governor Peter Stuyvesant. Because the immigrants still did not have sufficient funds to pay the fees, two individuals were imprisoned.

Upon their arrival, Governor Stuyvesant objected to their settlement because they did not have the required passports or funds to sustain themselves. representatives of the Jews living at that time in New York sent a remonstrance to the Dutch West India Company, advocating to allow the immigrants to settle in the new colony. They argued that land was plentiful and adding more loyal individuals would help to facilitate the Dutch West India Company's goal of expanding their colony. Jewish stockholders in the Dutch West India Company convinced the company to pressure the governor into accepting the arrivals, but the latter still imposed numerous restrictions and taxes on his Jewish subjects. Eventually, many of these Jews left. The Governor's objections were overruled by the Company in an order issued February 15, 1655 and Jews were allowed to travel, trade and live in the New Amsterdam Colony.

Asser Levy 
Asser Levy was the poorest of the first twenty three Jewish Immigrants.  He helped to file petitions that won the 23 immigrants the right to reside in New Amsterdam. As an advocate for Jews in the colony, the earliest mention of Asser Levy in a Court Record from New Amsterdam is September 15, 1654 as a plaintiff against unfair treatment of the Jewish immigrants. For example, Levy protested the policy of the exemption of Jews from enlisting in the army and being forced to pay an additional tax instead.

19th and 20th centuries 
The second period in American Jewish history was dominated by German Jewry. Jewish people looking for peace and new life, and especially in the 19th century, New York was somewhere to do it. Many settlers started careers in the arts, business, literature. Between the 1830s and 1880s, a growing number of middle class German Jews escaping from discrimination arrived in New York, seeking fame and fortune.  As the city continued to grow, so did the Jewish population. In 1848 German Jews in New York established B'nai B'rith, the first major secular organization.

When the Civil War started about 7,000 Jews fought for the Union and about 1,500 for the Confederacy. After the Civil War, New York Jews were more religiously split with a Reform movement rising in popularity.

The Great Wave 

Between 1880 and 1924, 2.5 million Ashkenazi Jews from the Russian Empire, Kingdom of Romania, and Austria-Hungary came to the United States and nearly 75 percent took up residence on the Lower East Side. The Jewish population in New York went from about 80,000 in 1880 to 1.5 million in 1920 This new mix of cultures changed what was a middle-class, acculturated, politically conservative community to a working-class, Yiddish-speaking group with a varied mix of ideologies including socialism, Zionism, and religious orthodoxy. The population of Jews eventually hit over one million by the 1900s and crowded into Jewish neighborhoods where they were not restricted from renting due to discriminatory policies that persisted until the end of World War II. The less-fortunate began to make the Lower East Side their own district as an influx of Jews reached the city between the 1870s and early 1900s.

The Jews of Central and Eastern Europe faced economic hardship, persecution, and social and political changes in the 1800s through the early 1900s, causing them to flee to the United States.  In Russia, there were waves of pogroms between 1881 and 1921.

In 1940, 90% of New York state's 2,206,328 (1937 figure) Jews resided in the city. However, the next two decades saw a flow to the suburbs.

Contributions

Jewish culture
Jewish people also found ways to carry on their same traditions and introduce some cultural aspects to New York City.

The bagel was brought to the United States in the early 20th century and became so popular that it is now a worldwide export. The recipe was fiercely safeguarded by Bagel Bakers Local 338, a union of 300 bagel craftsmen based in New York.

Judaism

The first Jewish congregation in the city, Shearith Israel was established in 1654. Founded in 1845, Temple Emanu-El on 5th Avenue in Manhattan's Upper East Side is the oldest Reform Jewish congregation in New York City, which developed into the largest and most prestigious Reform congregation in the country. The Angel Orensanz Center, originally Anshe Chesed Synagogue, is situated in the Lower East Side and was the largest synagogue in the United States at the time of its construction. The building has been standing since 1849, making it the oldest surviving synagogue.

Borough Park's inhabitants are mostly Orthodox and Hasidic Jews. The area in southwestern Brooklyn first began to have a Jewish presence in the early 1900s. The Hasidic immigration started after World War II, with the arrival of survivors from Nazi extermination camps and Eastern European ghettos.

Science 
Many Jews studied science and went to New York City, examples such as Otto Loewi, who moved to the United States in 1940, where he joined the faculty of New York University College of Medicine as a research professor of pharmacology. He was awarded the Nobel Prize in Physiology or Medicine in 1936, which he shared with Henry Dale.

Literature and theater
In the late 1800s to the early 1900s, people of the Jewish faith began to spread their art of theater throughout New York City. The Yiddish Theater was established in the Yiddish language in 1903, used by Jews in central and eastern Europe before the Holocaust. The Yiddish theater consisted mostly of Jewish people and settlers in New York performing Yiddish drama, folktale, and expanding theatrical culture throughout the city.

Numerous Jewish actors and playwrights in the 20th and 21st centuries have influenced the theater world. Notable examples include Tony Curtis, Stephen Sondheim, Scarlett Johansson and Barbra Streisand.

Riots and Strikes

Teachers' strike of 1968

Crown Heights riot of 1991

See also

 Jews in New York City
 History of the Jews in the United States

References

Further reading 

 Hasia R. Diner, Lower East Side Memories: A Jewish Place in America (2000)
 Susan L. Braunstein and Jenna Weissman Joselit, eds. Getting Comfortable in New York: The American Jewish Home, 1880-1950 (1990)
 Deborah Dash Moore, Jeffrey S. Gurock, Annie Polland, Howard B. Rock and Daniel Soyer, eds. Jewish New York: The Remarkable Story of a City and a People (2017)
 
 
 Annie Polland and Daniel Soyer, eds. Emerging Metropolis: New York Jews in the Age of Immigration, 1840-1920 (2012)
 Daniel Soyer, Jewish Immigrant Associations and American Identity in New York, 1880-1939: Jewish Landmanshaftn in American Culture (2001)
 Jeffrey S. Gurock, When Harlem Was Jewish, 1870-1930 (1979)

 
Jews
New York
Middle Eastern-American culture in New York (state)